Alexandria International Film Festival for Mediterranean Countries (AIFF) is a film festival in Egypt. The festival is organized by the Egyptian Association of Film Writers and Critics (EAFWC). The AIFF aims to broaden film culture and strengthen the relationship between filmmakers throughout the world, with special attention given to Mediterranean countries.

References

Further reading
 EgyptToday tag

Film festivals in Egypt